Orio al Serio International Airport, the third busiest international airport in Italy, is in Orio al Serio,  southeast of Bergamo and   north-east of Milan, where it operates alongside Malpensa Airport and Linate Airport, the city's other two primary airports. The airport served almost 13 million passengers in 2018.

Overview
The airport is managed by SACBO, a company partially owned by SEA – Aeroporti di Milano, the operator of Linate and Malpensa airports. SEA, the company that runs the latter two airports, also holds a 31% stake in SACBO. It is also christened "Il Caravaggio" after the Baroque painter Michelangelo Merisi da Caravaggio, who lived as a child at Caravaggio in the Province of Bergamo. There is one passenger terminal and two jet-bridge gates.

In March 2021, DHL Aviation announced plans to relocate their hub from Bergamo to Milan Malpensa Airport where DHL opened new logistics facilities. In early 2022, DHL confirmed the end of all operations at Bergamo.

Airlines and destinations

Passenger

The following airlines operate scheduled and charter services in Bergamo:

Cargo

Statistics

Traffic

Busiest routes

Accidents and incidents
 On 30 October 2005, Trade Air Flight 729 crashed near Bergamo, Italy, shortly after taking off in poor weather. The flight was a night-time cargo flight from Bergamo to Zagreb operated by a Let L-410 Turbolet with the registration 9A-BTA. All three people on board, two pilots and a passenger, were killed.
 On 5 August 2016, during the night, Boeing 737-476 (SF) registered HA-FAX, operated by ASL Airlines Hungary, overshot while landing on runway 28 in Bergamo and came to a stop on a parking lot and on a secondary highway lane that is around the airport, 300 m from the runway end. No one was injured, but some cars were destroyed and the plane sustained substantial damages. The plane was removed from the street the same day. The air traffic remained unvaried without delays.

Ground transportation

Car
The A4 is one of the main road networks that links the airport.

Bus
There are several public transportation links to and from downtown Milan, including express coaches. There are further connections to/from Bergamo city center, Arezzo, Bologna, Brescia, Monza, Turin, Malpensa Airport, and Milan Trade Exhibition Center, Parma, Torino, and Verona.

Railway
There is no official shuttle between the airport and the railway station. A bus service operated by ATB connects to the airport, about 10 minutes from the train station.

See also
 Transport in Milan
 List of airports in Italy

References

External links

 Official website
 
 

Buildings and structures in Bergamo
Transport in Bergamo
Airports in Milan
Airports established in 1937